Rebecca Jackson Mendoza  is an Australian actress, singer, and dancer.

Biography

Early life
Rebecca Jackson Mendoza was born in Melbourne, Australia to a Filipino father and an Australian mother of German descent. She first came to national prominence as half of the pop duo Jackson Mendoza, with her sister Natalie. They had minor success releasing two singles that reached the Top 30 in Australia before disbanding in 2000.

Career
Mendoza has had film roles in Howling III (1987) as a dancer, and Star Wars: Episode III – Revenge of the Sith (2005) as Queen Breha Organa. Her stage roles include Australian and German productions of Miss Saigon, Australian productions of Show Boat and Hair, Australian and Japanese productions of We Will Rock You, and Lady Galadriel in the Toronto production of The Lord of the Rings. Mendoza played "Miss Bell" in Fame: The Musical, Australia.

Stabbing incident
In 1999, Mendoza suffered a stroke after being stabbed in the chest by her estranged husband and fellow Show Boat cast member Marlon Brand, who committed suicide after the attack. The couple had a daughter named Phoenix.

Filmography

Film

References

External links
 
 Cast page at The Lord of the Rings - The Stage Musical website

 Reddit original tapes found

Australian female dancers
Australian women singers
Australian film actresses
Australian stage actresses
Living people
Actresses from Melbourne
Stabbing survivors
Australian actresses of Asian descent
Year of birth missing (living people)